In broadcasting, traffic is the scheduling of program material, and in particular the advertisements, for the broadcast day. In a commercial radio or TV station there is a vital link between sales (of advertisement or commercial space) and traffic in keeping the information about commercial time availability.

The station sells airtime to its customers. It is not unusual in a single hour for 18–20 minutes to be commercials.

The traffic department together with sales aims to sell the available airtime ("avails") at the best possible rates. The traffic department generates a daily log of programming elements such as commercials, features and public service announcements. The log defines when they are planned to be aired. The log will be used by the on-air operator who actually plays the commercials.  A copy of the log after the fact is used for reconciliation to determine what actually aired.

Typically a broadcaster uses a broadcast management software system that allows for automation between departments.  Some software systems are end-to-end and manage the whole spectrum of tasks required to broadcast a television or radio station, others specialize in specific areas, such as sales, programming, traffic, or automation for master control.

Process
The traffic process starts by a salesperson making an agreement with a customer about a campaign. The agreement is called a sales order and it defines the dates when spots (advertisements) are run and the commercial terms of the campaign. The sales order usually also defines the product group in order to avoid conflicts in scheduling, for example, where two fast food vendors have a spot in the same break.

At the station, a traffic person collects the sales orders and enters them into a computer system that will help to generate the daily logs. The traffic person also links the sales order with the possible media, such as an audio tape which contains the actual spot. When all the material is finished, the traffic system will be updated with parameters that define how the campaign will be run: in which dayparts there will be spots, how the spots are placed within a break, and what other separation criteria in addition to product groups there may be.

Broadcasting
Radio broadcasting
Television terminology